Główny Szlak Sudecki (full name Główny Szlak Sudecki im. Mieczysława Orłowicza, which means Mieczysław Orłowicz Main Sudetes Trail in Polish) is a public hiking trail in Poland running along the Sudetes. The total length of this route is 443 km and the approximate time to cover it's about 120 hours. The trail was constructed in 1947 and throughout its history has been several times modified. It is blazed red.

Towns and landmarks on the trail 
The trail starts in Świeradów Zdrój in the Jizera Mountains. In Szklarska Poręba it enters Karkonosze, the highest mountain range on its way. For the next 20 km it merges with the Polish - Czech Friendship Trail at Szrenica and runs on the main ridge along Polish and Czech border, to reach its culminating point, the highest peak in the Sudetes - Śnieżka. The path then descends to Karpacz and leads through another mountain range - Rudawy Janowickie. Having passed Krzeszów, the Stone Mountains and Owl Mountains the trail enters the area of the Kłodzko Valley and runs along the ridge of the Table Mountains with its reserves, spas such as Polanica-Zdrój, Duszniki-Zdrój and Kudowa-Zdrój and the Table Mountains National Park, one of the youngest national parks in Poland. Then it inclines to the north to run through the Śnieżnik Mountains, the second highest point on the route, then along the Golden Mountains. The trail finishes in Prudnik to include Opawskie Mountains as part of Sudetes, although until 2009 it used to finish in  Paczków.

Tourism and hiking 
The trail is accessible the whole year, although parts of it may be closed in winter due to the possibility of avalanches (Karkonosze) as well as dangerous marshes (Table Mountains). It does not involve any kind of advanced climbing, neither the mountain ranges are steep; nevertheless the long-distance hiking requires advance preparations. In the most difficult parts climbing aids are provided. The trail has numerous junctions with other trails and public paths In Karkonosze it is accessible through chairlifts  from both the Polish and Czech sides. 

There are many mountain huts and small hotels, especially in the western and middle parts, although some of them offer only common sleeping rooms and refreshments. Polish mountain huts are obliged to overnight each person who is not able to find any other place before sunset or in an emergency. Booking in advance is recommended. Most of the huts are run by the PTTK (Polish National Tourist Society). Refreshments and organised forms of catering are available on each part of the trail, although it is recommended to bring one's own food.

References

External links
  Online trail map

Sudetes
Hiking trails in Poland